Ryan James Elias (born 7 January 1995) is a Welsh rugby union player who plays for the Scarlets at hooker. He has represented Wales and Wales U20.

Club career 
Elias played youth rugby for Carmarthen Athletic, where his grandfather once served as club chairman. He later made the switch to rivals Carmarthen Quins, while progressing through the Scarlets academy.

Elias made his professional debut for the Scarlets on 17 November 2013, against the Saracens.

With first choice hooker and fellow Bro Myrddin graduate Ken Owens injured, Elias started the semi final against Leinster and final against Munster, winning the 2016–17 Pro12 title with the Scarlets.

Elias made his 100th appearance for the Scarlets on 5 January 2019, with a win against the Dragons.

International career
Elias featured for Wales U18 in 2013, and progressed into the Wales U20 ranks in 2014, making eight appearances for the team.In May 2017 Elias was named in the Wales senior squad for the tests against Tonga and Samoa in June 2017.

He made his debut on 16 June 2017, off the bench against Tonga at Eden Park and started the next test against Samoa.

In his third test appearance, Elias came off the bench against South Africa on 2 June 2018, scoring a late try to put Wales in the lead and ultimately secure the win.

Elias won the Grand Slam with Wales in the 2019 Six Nations, appearing off the bench against Italy, as Wales won their 11th match in a row.

Having been named in the Wales squad for the 2019 Rugby World Cup, Elias made one appearance, starting in the win against Uruguay.

Often shifting between a starting position and the bench, Elias was named to start all four of Wales's fixtures in the 2021 end-of-year rugby union internationals. He scored three tries, including a brace against Fiji. He retained the starting hooker position for the 2022 Six Nations, starting four of the five matches. 

Elias started all three of the tests during the 2022 mid-year rugby union tests, as Wales secured a first ever win in South Africa.

International tries

References

External links 
 Scarlets Player Profile
 Carmarthen Quins Player Profile
 ESPN Player Profile

Welsh rugby union players
Wales international rugby union players
Scarlets players
Living people
Rugby union players from Carmarthen
1995 births
Rugby union hookers